is a 2012 Japanese jidaigeki film directed by Toshiyuki Morioka.

Cast
Aimi Satsukawa
Ayaka Kikuchi
Shōgen
Satoshi Kurihara

References

External links

Jidaigeki films
2010s Japanese films